The Yemen President Cup  
is the top knockout tournament of Yemeni football.

Winners &, Runners up

By year

Championships by team

Total titles won by town or city

See also
 Yemeni League
 Yemeni Super

References

External links 
 Yemeni President Cup - Hailoosport.com (Arabic)
 Yemeni President Cup - Hailoosport.com

 

 
1
National association football cups
Recurring sporting events established in 1995
1990s establishments in Yemen